E. gobiensis  may refer to:
 Entelodon gobiensis, an extinct mammal species
 Eptesicus gobiensis, the Gobi big brown bat, a bat species found in Afghanistan, China, India, Mongolia, Pakistan and Russia

See also
 Gobiensis